The BSA Mercury was a break barrel, spring powered, Air Rifle first produced in 1972 by the Birmingham Small Arms Company and then Gamo (UK) Limited.  It was manufactured in .177 (4.5 mm) .22 (5.5 mm) and .25 (6.35 mm), the latter named the "635 Magnum". The Mercury was marketed between the BSA Meteor and AirSporter models and was a light, easy to use rifle, giving a "just under legal limit UK power" of 11.5 ft•lbf (15.6 J) of energy.

Approximately 40,000 were produced in three different purely cosmetic versions and a higher quality "S" model in 1980.

Specifications
 Overall Length: Rifle 104 cm/42in
 Barrel Length: 47 cm/18.5 in
 Weight: 3 kg/6.6 lbs

Operation
The rifle shared the trigger, piston assembly and spring with the BSA AirSporter with the spring and piston being compressed by breaking the barrel through 125° before loading a pellet directly into the breech. The barrel was then returned into place and secured with a detent lock.  The single-stage trigger was adjustable for pressure and travel. The sights were plastic with the front sight being able to be switched from a bead to a blade and the rear adjustable sight could switch between a "V" and "square notch".  The cylinder had two very shallow 11mm wide grooves to accept a telescopic sight.  It had a beech wood stock and a rubber recoil pad.  The top of the barrel was stamped BSA GUNS LTD ENGLAND followed by a BSA piled arms symbol and the air chamber was stamped BSA MERCURY between the scope rails. 

A negative point was that the barrel pivot was a low-cost pin rather than a bolt/nut assembly and this could lead to barrel, cylinder misalignment.  The Mercury, being a spring-gun suffered from recoil and was noisy for an air rifle.  Range was limited to about 40m, with 25m being the maximum realistic hunting range.

The rifle was packed in a polystyrene tray with a printed cardboard sleeve. The standard kit included a bottle of oil, a small tube of Eley Wasp pellets and a pressed steel target holder with a few targets.

Differences between versions
Changes between Mks are far from straightforward as BSA would use up parts on newer rifles. They all had beech stock and the internals are similar.
 Mk1 - Steel, single-stage trigger, single-piece cocking arm and a blued finish - serial number prefix WA 0.177/ZA 0.22
 Mk2 - Plastic, single-stage trigger, single-piece cocking arm black painted finish - serial number prefix WB 0.177/ZB 0.22
 Mk3 - Two-stage trigger, 2-piece articulated cocking arm and a blued finish - serial number prefix WC 0.177/ZC 0.22

Upgrades
In response to competition from German Manufactured Air weapons,’ it was re-launched in 1980 as the Mercury "S" with a checkered Walnut stock, thicker barrel, an articulated cocking lever, metal open sights, the barrel axis pin was replaced by a bolt and the metalwork had a blued finish. The quality of the "S" version is considered superior to earlier guns - serial number prefix WH 0.177/ZH 0.22.

Also in 1980, BSA offered a Mercury Mk3 in .25 (6.35 mm) calibre marketed as the 635 Magnum, with a shorter barrel and a peep sight - serial number prefix AWC. The gun was not popular and production ceased in 1987.

In 1985, it was upgraded again to the Mercury Challenger with the addition of the "Maxi-grip scope rail", modified, cylinder, larger trigger block to meet flush with the scope rail, two-stage trigger, blued finish, walnut stock and an articulated cocking arm, with serial number prefixes; WD 0.177 / ZD 0.22.

The Mercury was superseded by the BSA Supersport in 1986.

See also
 List of air guns

References

External links
 BSA Guns Home Page
 The BSA Mercury at Airgun shooting.co.uk - 24 April 2018

Air guns of the United Kingdom